Playthings of Passion is a lost 1919 drama film directed by Wallace Worsley and starring Kitty Gordon. It was produced and released by an independent film company.

Cast
Kitty Gordon - Helen Rowland
Mahlon Hamilton - Henry Rowland
Lawson Butt - John Sterling (*as W. Lawson Butt)
Richard Rosson - Spiffy (*as Dick Rosson)

References

External links

lobby poster

1919 films
American silent feature films
Lost American films
Films directed by Wallace Worsley
American black-and-white films
Silent American drama films
1919 drama films
1919 lost films
Lost drama films
1910s American films